This is a list of assassinated American politicians sorted alphabetically. They were elected or appointed to office, or were candidates for public office.

There are 54 assassinated American politicians listed. The most common method of homicide was with one or more gunshots, leading to the death of 49 politicians on the list.

See also

List of assassinated people
List of assassinated US presidents
List of United States Congress members killed or wounded in office
List of United States federal judges killed in office
Political murder

References

Assassinated American politicians
American politicians
Assassinated politicians